Álvaro Elías Loredo (born 19 February 1947) is a Mexican politician affiliated with the National Action Party. As of 2014 he served as Deputy of the LI, LVII and LIX Legislatures of the Mexican Congress representing San Luis Potosí. He was President of the Directive Board of the Chamber of Deputies from 27 April to 31 August 2006. As of 2014, he was serving as the Deputy of the LI, LVII, and LIX Legislature in the Mexican Congress. He represents San Luis Potosí.

References

1947 births
Living people
People from San Luis Potosí
20th-century Mexican lawyers
Presidents of the Chamber of Deputies (Mexico)
National Action Party (Mexico) politicians
Deputies of the LIX Legislature of Mexico
Members of the Chamber of Deputies (Mexico) for San Luis Potosí